Hey or Hey! may refer to:

Music
 Hey (band), a Polish rock band

Albums
 Hey (Andreas Bourani album) or the title song (see below), 2014
 Hey! (Julio Iglesias album) or the title song, 1980
 Hey! (Jullie album) or the title song, 2009
 Hey! Album, by Marvelous 3, 1998
 Hey, by the Glitter Band, 1974
 Hey!, by the Gruesomes, 1988
 Hey, by Toni Price, 1995
 Hey: A Pixies Tribute, a Pixies tribute album, 2003

EPs
 Hey (EP) or the title song, by Le1f, 2014
 Hey!, by Dzeko & Torres, 2012
 Hey!, by the Regrettes, 2015

Songs
 "Hey" (Andreas Bourani song), 2015
 "Hey" (Fais song), 2016
 "Hey" (Flow song), 2011
 "Hey" (Lil Jon song), 2010
 "Hey" (Mitchel Musso song), 2009
 "Hey!" (Masaharu Fukuyama song), 2000
 "Hey", by Alvvays from Antisocialites, 2017
 "Hey", by Bic Runga from Drive, 1997
 "Hey", by Crystal Bernard, 1999
 "Hey", by Gillmor, opening theme for the U.S. sitcom Unhitched, 2008
 "Hey!", by the Go! Team from Semicircle, 2018
 "Hey", by the Goo Goo Dolls from Hold Me Up, 1990
 "Hey", by Hanson from Underneath, 2004
 "Hey!", by the Hellacopters from Payin' the Dues, 1997
 "Hey", by Leeland from Sound of Melodies, 2006
 "Hey", by Low from Hey What, 2021
 "Hey!", by MF Doom from Operation: Doomsday, 1999
 "Hey", by Movielife from Forty Hour Train Back to Penn, 2003
 "Hey!", by Oingo Boingo from Boingo, 1994
 "Hey", by the Pixies from Doolittle, 1989
 "Hey", by the Red Hot Chili Peppers from Stadium Arcadium, 2006
 "Hey", by the Suicide Machines from Destruction by Definition, 1996
 "Hey (I've Been Feeling Kind of Lonely)", by Danny Saucedo from Heart Beats, 2007
 "Hey! (Rise of the Robots)", by The Stranglers from Black and White, 1978
 "Hey! (So What)", by Dannii Minogue from Neon Nights, 2003
 "Rock and Roll" (Gary Glitter song), commonly known as "The Hey song", 1972

Other uses
 Hey (surname)
 Hey (company), a Faroese telecommunications company
 Hey (email service), an email service by Basecamp
 Hey (magazine), a defunct Turkish music magazine
 Hey, Iran, a village in Zanjan Province
 Hanchey Army Heliport (IATA code)
 Informal synonym for Hello

See also
 
 Hey Hey (disambiguation)
 Hay (disambiguation)
 Heya (disambiguation)
 Hei (disambiguation)
 Hej